Tail Swallower and Dove is the third and final album by Seattle-based post-hardcore band These Arms Are Snakes, released on October 7, 2008, on Suicide Squeeze Records. The album was re-released in 2017 ahead of the band's reunion shows.

Track listing

Personnel

Band members

Brian Cook – bass guitar, microKORG, vocals and pump organ
Ryan Frederiksen – guitar, pump organ and design
Steve Snere – vocals and microKORG
Chris Common – drums, percussion, engineering and mixing

Additional personnel

Mark Gajadhar - Additional studio assistance
Alicjia Trout - Additional vocals on "Red Line Season"
John Spalding - Additional guitar on "Briggs"
Frank McCauley - Artwork

References

Suicide Squeeze Records albums
2008 albums
These Arms Are Snakes albums
Albums produced by Matt Bayles